Gentofte Hospital (Copenhagen University Hospital Gentofte) is located in Gentofte within Copenhagen in Denmark. Administratively, it is part of the hospital service of Region Hovedstaden. The hospital primarily serves the municipalities of Gentofte, Lyngby-Taarbæk, and Rudersdal, with a population of about 175,000.

History
The hospital was opened in 1927.

Facilities and departments

As one of the university hospitals for Copenhagen University (the hospital is also a teaching hospital for medical students from the university), the hospital has extensive research and training facilities. Two large medical departments cover gastroenterology, endocrinology, rheumatology, geriatric medicine and stroke rehabilitation. It also houses dedicated cardiology and pulmonary medicine departments, an ENT department with the largest audiology department in Denmark and a dermatology and allergy unit. The hospital also hosts the regional department for innovations in elective surgery. Additionally, Gentofte Hospital has both a closed and open psychiatric ward.

See also
Region Hovedstadens Psykiatri for the psychiatric department of the hospital

References

External links
Gentofte Hospital 

Hospital buildings completed in 1927
Hospitals in Copenhagen
Hospitals in Denmark
Hospitals established in 1927
Buildings and structures in Gentofte Municipality
1927 establishments in Denmark